Symphony No. 6 in B Minor may refer to:

 Symphony No. 6 (Tchaikovsky) Pathetique
 Felix Weingartner's Symphony No. 6, op. 74 "in Gedenken des 19. November 1828"
 Symphony No. 6 (Shostakovich)

See also
 List of symphonies in B minor